Salute to Satch is a tribute album to Louis Armstong by jazz trumpeter Joe Newman and His Orchestra recorded in 1956 for the RCA Victor label.

Reception

Allmusic awarded the album 3 stars, stating "Newman makes a keen tribute to his mentor, featuring a tart big band".

Track listing
 "When the Saints Go Marching In" (Traditional) – 2:40	
 "Chinatown, My Chinatown" (Jean Schwartz, William Jerome) – 2:42
 "West End Blues" (King Oliver) – 4:00 	
 "Jeepers Creepers" (Harry Warren, Johnny Mercer) – 2:46
 "Dipper Mouth Blues" (Oliver, Louis Armstrong) – 2:40 	
 "When It's Sleepy Time Down South" (Clarence Muse, Leon René, Otis René) – 3:01
 "Struttin' with Some Barbeque" (Lil Hardin Armstrong, Don Raye) – 2:40
 "Pennies from Heaven" (Arthur Johnston, Johnny Burke) – 3:07
 "Basin Street Blues" (Spencer Williams) – 3:30 	
 "Back O'Town Blues" (Louis Armstrong, Luis Russell) – 3:46	
 "Sweethearts on Parade" (Carmen Lombardo, Charles Newman) – 2:13	
 "You Can Depend On Me" (Charles Carpenter, Louis Dunlap, Earl Hines) – 2:55
Recorded at Webster Hall in New York City on March 4 (tracks 9–12), March 11 (tracks 3 & 6–8) and March 14 (tracks 1, 2, 4 & 5), 1956

Personnel 
Joe Newman- trumpet, vocals
Conte Candoli, Joe Ferrante, Bernie Glow, Ernie Royal (tracks 3 & 6–8), Nick Travis (tracks 1, 2, 4, 5 & 9–12) – trumpet 
Jimmy Cleveland, Urbie Green (tracks 1, 2, 4, 5 & 9–12), Fred Ohms (tracks 3 & 6–8), Tommy Mitchell (tracks 1, 2, 4, 5 & 9–12), Benny Powell (tracks 3 & 6–8), Chauncey Welsch – trombone
Phil Woods, Sam Marowitz – alto saxophone
Al Cohn – tenor saxophone, clarinet
Eddie Wasserman – tenor saxophone
Al Epstein – baritone saxophone
Hank Jones (tracks 1, 2, 4, 5 & 9–12), Nat Pierce (tracks 3 & 6–8) – piano
Barry Galbraith (tracks 9–12), Freddie Green (tracks 1–8) – guitar
Buddy Jones (tracks 9–12), Eddie Jones (tracks 1–8) – bass
Gus Johnson – drums
Manny Albam (tracks 3 & 5–9), Al Cohn (track 1), Ernie Wilkins (tracks 2, 4 & 10–12

References 

1956 albums
RCA Records albums
Joe Newman (trumpeter) albums
Albums arranged by Manny Albam
Albums arranged by Ernie Wilkins
Louis Armstrong tribute albums